Tali Ete'aki, (born circa 1963) is a former Tongan rugby union footballer who played as a fullback.

Career
His first international cap for Tonga was during a match against Fiji, in Suva, on 21 July 1984. He was also part of the 1987 Rugby World Cup squad, playing all the three pool stage matches against Ireland, Canada and Wales. In the latter match, where the Welsh winger Glen Webbe got hit in the chin by a flying tackle done by Ete'aki. Ete'aki last played for Tonga in the match against Samoa in Nuku'alofa, on 28 May 1991.

Notes

External links
Scrum.com profile

1963 births
Living people
Tongan rugby union players
Rugby union fullbacks
Tonga international rugby union players